One Yonge Street (also known as the Toronto Star Building) is a 25-storey office building that serves as the headquarters of Torstar and its flagship newspaper, the Toronto Star. It is 100 metres tall and built in the International style.  It was built as a replacement to the Old Toronto Star Building, which was located at 80 King Street West.  That building was torn down to make room for First Canadian Place.

1 Yonge Street is located in Queens Quay, and marks the foot of what was Highway 11, mistakenly believed to be "the longest street in the world".

The building also housed the printing presses for the Toronto Star newspaper, until 1992 when a new press centre was opened in Vaughan, Ontario.  The finished newspaper content is sent electronically to the plant where the plates are burnt and the paper is printed and distributed. Editorial content of the newspaper is produced by employees working on the fifth floor. It also has the headquarters of Torstar.

The office space at One Yonge Street is also leased out to a variety of other companies, including Pinnacle International, the Liquor Control Board of Ontario, Ontario Cannabis Retail Corporation, RL Solutions, Starbucks, Luminus Financial, a dental office, and the downtown Toronto campus of Collège Boréal.

Torstar sold the building and its surrounding property to a private holding company in 2000 for $40 million, but the newspaper continued to occupy several floors of the building on a long-term lease. The Toronto Star is expected to vacate the building and move its offices to 410 Front Street West in 2022.

Redevelopment
The parking lot and podium associated with this building are part of a high-profile development known as Pinnacle One Yonge by developer Pinnacle International and designed by Hariri Pontarini Architects.  The project includes five skyscrapers on two parcels of land bisected by an eastern extension of Harbour Street. The tallest tower would reach 95 storeys for a total height of 307 metres, making it the tallest in Canada.  The three residential towers would total 2,962 condo units, and the two commercial towers would provide 154,000 sq.m of space.

See also

Old Globe and Mail Building
Toronto Sun Building
Toronto Star Press Centre

References

External links

. Retrieved on 2009-05-29.

Skyscrapers in Toronto
Modernist architecture in Canada
Newspaper headquarters in Canada
Toronto Star
Skyscraper office buildings in Canada
Office buildings completed in 1970